Montana Highway 117 (MT 117) is a  state highway in the U.S. state of Montana. Formerly Secondary Highway 249, the route allows traffic from MT 24 at Fort Peck to travel north to U.S. Route 2 (US 2) at Nashua, providing a shortcut between the two routes, as well as providing access from the north to the Fort Peck Dam and Fort Peck Lake.

Route description

Highway 117 begins at the western end of the Fort Peck Dam, in a tightly angled junction with Highway 24. It proceeds eastwards, winding its way through the town of Fort Peck before turning northwards at a T-intersection on its northern outskirts. The road then proceeds past the Missouri River on its right, and heads in a generally northeasterly orientation. After crossing the Milk River, Highway 117 enters Nashua from the southwest and curves east, before taking a left turn and crossing the BNSF Railway's Northern Transcon, linking the two halves of Nashua together. Soon, the road meets U.S. Route 2 on the town's northern side and terminates.

Major intersections

References

117